The 2000 Bracknell Forest Borough Council election took place on 4 May 2000, to elect all 40 members in 19 wards for Bracknell Forest Borough Council in England.  The election was held on the same day as other local elections in England as part of the 2000 United Kingdom local elections.  The Conservative Party secured a second term in office, increasing its majority.  As the last council election in 1997 was held alongside the general election, turnout was sharply down.

Ward results
An asterisk (*) denotes an incumbent councillor standing for re-election

Ascot

Binfield

Bullbrook

Central Sandhurst

College Town

Cranbourne

Crowthorne

Garth

Great Hollands North

Great Hollands South

Hanworth

Harmans Water

Little Sandhurst

Old Bracknell

Owlsmoor

Priestwood

St. Marys

Warfield

Wildridings

By-elections

Hanworth

Priestwood

References

Bracknell
Bracknell Forest Borough Council elections